Okot, a Ugandan name, may refer to:

People
Dennis Okot (born 1990), Ugandan footballer
Josephine Okot (born 1970), Ugandan businesswoman
Kal Okot (born 1990), Ugandan-English footballer 
Mike Okot (born 1958), Ugandan sprinter
Santa Okot, Ugandan politician
Okot Odhiambo (died 2013), Ugandan rebel; senior leader of the Lord's Resistance Army
Okot p'Bitek (1931–1982), Ugandan poet

Other uses
Okot River, Uganda
Okot, a forest god in the mythology of the Bicolano people of the Philippines